José Martín Antonio Gautier Benítez  (April 12, 1848 – January 24, 1880) was a Puerto Rican poet of the Romantic Era.

Early years
Gautier Benítez was born in Caguas, Puerto Rico to Rodulfo Gautier and the Puerto Rican poet, Alejandrina Benitez de Gautier. His great-aunt, María Bibiana Benítez, was also a well known Puerto Rican poet. He was mostly influenced by the exponents of the Romantic poetry of the 19th century. His great-great-uncle was José Benítez, mayor of Ponce in 1800.

Gautier Benítez's father wanted him to take up a military career and so in 1865, he was sent to military school in San Juan. When he graduated, he went to Madrid, Spain, where he continued his military education.

When Gautier Benítez returned to Puerto Rico from Spain, he found a job in the provincial government office. According to his military records, between September 26 and November 8 of 1868, Gautier Benítez fought against the members of the "Revolution Committee of Puerto Rico" involved in "El Grito de Lares", a short lived independence revolt against Spanish rule in Puerto Rico.

In 1873 he joined the Liberal Reformist Party and became a principal force behind the creation of the Ateneo Puertorriqueño.  In 1878 he became the co-founder, along with his friend Manuel de Elzabura, of the Puerto Rican Review. That same year he wrote his first poem A Puerto Rico (To Puerto Rico), was highly acclaimed by his contemporaries as one of his greatest works.  A Puerto Rico also received an award from the Ateneo.

Later years
In 1879, Gautier Benítez's mother, Alejandrina, died and he also became terminally ill with tuberculosis. He retired to his house where he would live until he died. Gautier Benítez died in San Juan, aged 32 years of age and is laid to rest in Santa Maria Magdalena de Pazzis Cemetery in Old San Juan. Gautier Benítez's verses, entitled Poemas (Poems) were published posthumously in 1880.

Poems by Gautier Benítez

Among his works are: A Puerto Rico (Ausencia) (To Puerto Rico (Absence)), A Puerto Rico (Regreso) (To Puerto Rico (Return)) and the following:.

Americana
Como Tu Quieras
Deber De Amar
El Manzanillo
El Poeta
Ella y Yo
Enfermo
INSOMNIO
La Barca
La Nave
Las Aves De Paso
Los Ojos De T.
Oriental
Romance
Un Encargo A Mis  Amigos
Un Sueño
Zoraida

Legacy and honors
The city of Caguas named a high school  and public housing project after Gautier Benítez. The island–municipality of Vieques honored him by naming its public library the José Gautier Benítez Public Library.  In the municipality of Hatillo an elementary school was named after him. The song "Lamento Borincano", from Rafael Hernández mentions Gautier Benítez in it "Borinquen, la tierra del edén. La que al cantar, el gran Gautier llamó la perla de los mares." In 2019 construction began on the José Gautier Benítez Development, a mixed-income residential area in Caguas.

See also

List of Puerto Rican writers
List of Puerto Ricans
Puerto Rican literature
French immigration to Puerto Rico

Note

References

1851 births
1880 deaths
Puerto Rican poets
Puerto Rican male writers
People from Caguas, Puerto Rico
Puerto Rican people of French descent
Tuberculosis deaths in Puerto Rico
19th-century deaths from tuberculosis
Puerto Rican Army personnel
19th-century American poets
American male poets
19th-century American male writers